The men's freestyle 92 kg is a competition featured at the Golden Grand Prix Ivan Yarygin 2018, and was held in Krasnoyarsk, Russia on the 28th of January.

Medalists

Results
Legend
F — Won by fall

Final

Top half
qualification: Yuri Belonovskiy of Krasnoyarsk Krai def. Akhmed Bataev of Chechnya (3–1)
qualification: Anzor Urishev of Kabardino-Balkaria def. Guram Chartekoev of Crimea (10–0)

Section 1

Repechage

References

Men's freestyle 92 kg